Fantasies About Illness is the second album released by Oneiroid Psychosis. "Assuage" was the only single released for the album, and in fact, the only single OP have ever released. CMJ ranked the album #23 on the Top 25 Dance albums in May 1997. The album artwork is by Paul Nitsche.

Track listing
 "Psychasthene"  – 4:21
 "Assuage"  – 6:00 words by Lars
 "Midnight Mist"  – 5:13 words by Leif
 "Box"  – 5:05 words by Lars
 "Apostasy"  – 3:58 words by Leif
 "Influence of Organism"  – 7:48 words by Lars
 "Symbion"  – 4:55
 "Obscurum Per Obscuris"  – 5:56
 "Arise and Pass Away"  – 6:21 words by Leif
 "Somnambulus"  – 5:54 words by Leif
 "The Micro-Implant Conspiracy"  – 2:03

Sample credits
  "Micro-implant Conspiracy"
"I was informed that they would use micro-stimulators in the uteruses of women - they artificially stimulate them sexually which is how they create sadistic women and they put the sound of pleasure into the inner mind with implants with like implanted teeth or when tonsils are removed or as stitches in front of the left ear and then they maneuver the women into intimidating the men and they maneuver the men into responding (rather than out the door) at the woman and my wife is being used in a sadistic fashion in conspiracy against me."
-Spoken by a deranged guy on COPS
 "Box"
"You can't understand it. You're frightened because you can't understand it."
- Dr. Dastrom from Star Trek "The Ultimate Computer"

References

1996 albums
Oneiroid Psychosis albums